Events from the year 1856 in Canada.

Incumbents
Monarch — Victoria

Federal government
Parliament — 5th

Governors
Governor General of the Province of Canada — Edmund Walker Head

Premiers
Joint Premiers of the Province of Canada —
 Canada West Premier
,
 Canada East Premier

British North America Colonies
Colonial Governor of Newfoundland — Charles Henry Darling
Premier of Newfoundland — Philip Francis Little
Governor of Nova Scotia — John Gaspard Le Marchant
Premier of Nova Scotia — William Young
Governor of New Brunswick — John Manners-Sutton
Premier of New Brunswick — Charles Fisher
Governor of Prince Edward Island — Dominick Daly
Premier of Prince Edward Island — John Holl

Events
Mar 30 – British Empire's Crimean War ends
May 15 – Creation of the village of Embrun, Ontario.
Formation of the British Methodist Episcopal Church (BME), an all Black church.
October 27 – The two halves of the Grand Trunk Railway are joined with the construction of the Oshawa–Brockville section of the original mainline. Celebratory trains meet near the centre of the line at Kingston. The western terminus of the mainline is the east bank of the Don River.
 While surveying lands recently acquired by the Crown under the Robinson-Huron Treaty, British land surveyor Albert Salter observes a significant magnetic anomaly near the future site of Creighton Mine in modern-day Northern Ontario. This is an early scientific observation of the vast mineral resources of the Sudbury Basin.

Births
May 16 – Charles Melville Hays, railway executive (died 1912)
May 20 – Eliza Ritchie, feminist
July 6 – Kate Simpson Hayes, playwright and legislative librarian (died 1945)
July 31 – John Oliver, politician and Premier of British Columbia (died 1927)

Deaths
December – Samuel Street Wilmot, surveyor, tanner, farmer, justice of the peace, and assemblyman in Upper Canada (b. 1773)

References 

 
Canada
Years of the 19th century in Canada
1856 in North America